David Tomášek (born February 10, 1996) is a Czech professional ice hockey player. He is currently playing for HC Sparta Praha of the Czech Extraliga (ELH).

Tomášek made his Czech Extraliga debut playing with HC Pardubice during the 2015–16 Czech Extraliga season. He joined JYP Jyväskylä prior to the 2018–19 season.

References

External links

1996 births
Living people
Amur Khabarovsk players
HC Dynamo Pardubice players
Belleville Bulls players
Czech ice hockey centres
JYP Jyväskylä players
Ice hockey people from Prague
HC Sparta Praha players
Czech expatriate ice hockey players in Canada
Czech expatriate ice hockey players in the United States
Czech expatriate ice hockey players in Russia
Czech expatriate ice hockey players in Finland